Putnok VSE is a Hungarian football club located in Putnok, Hungary. It currently plays in Hungarian National Championship II. The team's colors are blue and black.

Current squad

Season results
As of 6 August 2017

References

External links 
  
 Soccerway

Football clubs in Hungary
Association football clubs established in 1991
1991 establishments in Hungary